Westringia brevifolia, also known as the greater shortleaf westringia, is a species of plant in the mint family that is endemic to Tasmania.

References

brevifolia
Lamiales of Australia
Flora of Tasmania
Taxa named by George Bentham
Plants described in 1834